Bucks Fizz was a British pop group.

Bucks Fizz or Buck's Fizz may also refer to:
 Buck's Fizz, an alcoholic cocktail beverage
 Bucks Fizz (album), a self-titled album by the band